Senator Sexton may refer to:

Franklin Barlow Sexton (1828–1900), Texas State Senate
Jesse Sexton (1885–1948), Missouri State Senate
Landon Sexton (born 1941), Kentucky State Senate
Mike Sexton (politician) (born 1961), Iowa State Senate